Unity Theatre may refer to one of several theatres:

United Kingdom
In the United Kingdom, the Unity theatre movement developed from workers' drama groups in the 1930s, seeing itself as using theatre to highlight the issues of the working class being produced by and for working-class audiences. The movement had strong links with the Communist Party of Great Britain and the Left Book Club Theatre Guild.

At one time there were over 50 local theatre groups known as "Unity Theatre":
 Unity Theatre, Liverpool
 Unity Theatre, London
 Unity Theatre, Manchester
 Glasgow Unity Theatre

New Zealand
 Unity Theatre, Wellington

United States
 The Unity Theatre, Brenham, Texas